Hobhouse is a small farming town in the Free State province of South Africa, named after welfare campaigner Emily Hobhouse. Maize, wheat, cheese and livestock are produced here.

Background 
Town 32 km north-east of Wepener and 51 km south-west of Ladybrand, near the Lesotho border. It was laid out on the farm Poortjie in 1912 and attained municipal status in 1913. Named after Emily Hobhouse (1860-1926), author and philanthropist who brought to public notice abuses in concentration camps during the Anglo-Boer War.

References

Populated places in the Mantsopa Local Municipality
Populated places established in 1912
1912 establishments in South Africa